Cristian Antonio Agnelli (born 23 September 1985) is an Italian professional footballer who plays as a midfielder.

Career

Club career
Agnelli began his professional career with hometown club Foggia, making his debut in May 2002. He signed for Lecce in January 2003 and spent loan spells at Verona, Catanzaro, Juve Stabia, Salernitana and Benevento.

Agnelli was released from his contract with Lecce in January 2010, six months early. He consequently returned to Foggia on 6-month contract.

On 7 August 2010, Agnelli signed a 1-year contract with Barletta.
On 28 August 2012, he re-joined Foggia again.

On 12 September 2019, he signed with Pergolettese.

On 1 September 2021, he moved to Audace Cerignola.

International career
Agnelli participated at the 2005 FIFA World Youth Championship.

References

External links

1985 births
Living people
Sportspeople from Foggia
Footballers from Apulia
Italian footballers
Association football midfielders
Serie B players
Serie C players
Lega Pro Seconda Divisione players
Serie D players
Calcio Foggia 1920 players
U.S. Lecce players
Hellas Verona F.C. players
U.S. Catanzaro 1929 players
S.S. Juve Stabia players
U.S. Salernitana 1919 players
Benevento Calcio players
A.S.D. Sorrento players
A.S.D. Barletta 1922 players
S.P.A.L. players
U.S. Pergolettese 1932 players
S.S.D. F.C. Messina players
S.S.D. Audace Cerignola players
Italy youth international footballers
Italy under-21 international footballers